Hilal Al Rasheedi (born January 1, 1963 in Al-Tawiyah) is an Omani sport shooter. He competed at the 2000 Summer Olympics in the men's 50 metre rifle prone event, in which he tied for 25th place, and the men's 10 metre air rifle event, in which he placed 44th.

References

1963 births
Living people
ISSF rifle shooters
Omani male sport shooters
Olympic shooters of Oman
Shooters at the 2000 Summer Olympics
People from Al Batinah South Governorate
20th-century Omani people